EB Start Elbląg is a Polish women's handball team, based in Elbląg, playing in Polish Ekstraklasa Women's Handball League (Premiership League).

Titles 

 Ekstraklasa
 Winners (2) : 1992, 1994
 Polish Handball Cup
 Winners (3) : 1993, 1994, 1999

European record

Team

Current squad 

Squad for the 2017–18 season

Goalkeepers
  Alicja Klarkowska
  Klaudia Powaga
  Solomija Szywerska

Wingers
RW
  Magda Balsam
  Aleksandra Jedrzejczyk
LW 
  Daria Gerej
  Dominika Hawryszko
Line Players 
  Aleksandra Stokłosa
  Aleksandra Dorsz

Back players
  Sylwia Lisewska
  Patrycja Swierczewska
  Joanna Waga 
  Hanna Yashchuk
  Katarzyna Kozimur
  Aleksandra Kwiecinska

External links
 Official website
 EHF Club profile

See also
 Handball in Poland
 Sports in Poland

Polish handball clubs
Sport in Elbląg